Nova is a cable television network launched on 15 December 2017. Nova S, alongside the channels Nova TV, Nova BH and Nova M are part of United Media and owned by United Group.

References

External links

Television stations in Serbia
Television channels in North Macedonia
Television channels and stations established in 2019